The 1996 African Judo Championships took place from May 16 to May 19, 1996, in South Africa.

Results

Men

Women

Medal table

References

External links
 

African Judo Championships
African Championships
Judo competitions in South Africa
May 1996 sports events in Africa
1996 in South African sport